Sowmya Reddy  is an Indian politician who is the current General Secretary of All India Mahila Congress of Karnataka and a member of the Indian National Congress. She was elected as a member of the Legislative Assembly of Karnataka from Jayanagar in 2018. Sowmya Reddy is the daughter of former Karnataka minister Ramalinga Reddy.

She is an environmentalist, who has campaigned against  the use of plastic as well as promoted the planting of trees to increase greenery in Bengaluru.

During the COVID-19 pandemic, she has conducted numerous campaigns for providing cooked meals and dry rations to the people in her constituency.

She has studied M.S. (Environmental Technology) from New York Institute of Technology and B.E. (Chemical Engineering) from R.V. College of Engineering.

References

Indian National Congress politicians from Karnataka
Living people
Karnataka MLAs 2018–2023
Reddy, Sowmya